Count Dmitry Andreyevich Tolstoy (Moscow – , Saint Petersburg) was a Russian statesman, a member of the State Council of Imperial Russia (1866). He belonged to the comital branch of the Tolstoy family.

Tolstoy graduated from the Tsarskoye Selo Lyceum in 1843. He held a managing position at the Ministry of the Navy beginning in 1853. Tolstoy was an Ober-Procurator of the Holy Synod in 1865–1880, simultaneously holding a post of the Minister of National Enlightenment in 1866–1880. In 1871, Tolstoy was in charge of the college reform, which would result in the prevalence of the classical education (included Latin and Greek languages and ancient literature, among other things). In 1872, as Education minister, Tolstoy agreed to the opening by V. I. Guerrier of his Higher Women's Courses in Moscow, thus establishing higher education for women in Russia.

In 1882–1889, Tolstoy was the interior minister and Chief of Gendarmerie. He is considered one of the pillars of the political reaction in the 1880s and supporter of the strong authority. Tolstoy's activities were aimed at backing the nobility, regulating peasantry's modus vivendi, and spreading his administration's influence over local authorities. On Tolstoy's initiative, they issued the so-called "Temporary regulations" in 1882, which limited the freedom of press to an even greater extent. Tolstoy, together with A. Pazukhin, outlined and prepared the so-called "counterreforms", which would become very unpopular in Russia. As one of the great counter reformers of the post Crimean period Tolstoy used his position as minister of education to promote study at university and secondary levels that would bolster Russia as a nation with honest people in power looking to maintain Orthodoxy and Autocracy: something in danger during Tolstoy's rule as the post Crimean period of reform amounted also to increasing rebellion and student dissent. Tolstoy did his best to educate a Russia, and moreover a Russian elite that would maintain Orthodoxy and Autocracy while being in mountable competition with the West. His focus was on consolidating his power over education while suppressing revolutionary attitudes by just censorship, etc.

Tolstoy was elected president of the St. Petersburg Academy of Sciences in 1882. He wrote a number of books on Russian history.

External links
 Dmitry Tolstoy

1823 births
1889 deaths
Politicians from Moscow
People from Moskovsky Uyezd
Dmitriy
Counts of the Russian Empire
Interior ministers of Russia
Education ministers
Members of the State Council (Russian Empire)
Politicians of the Russian Empire
Most Holy Synod
Demidov Prize laureates
Tsarskoye Selo Lyceum alumni
Honorary members of the Saint Petersburg Academy of Sciences